The Niger Delta People's Volunteer Force (NDPVF) is one of the largest armed groups in the Niger Delta region of Nigeria and is composed primarily of members of the region's largest ethnic group—the Ijaw people. The group was founded in 2004 in an attempt to gain more control over the region's vast petroleum resources, particularly in Delta State. The NDPVF has frequently demanded a greater share of the oil wealth from both the state and federal government and has occasionally supported independence for the Delta region. Until 2005 the group was spearheaded by Alhaji Mujahid Dokubo-Asari, who is viewed by many Delta residents as a folk hero.

History 
The Niger Delta People's Volunteer Force was organised in late 2003 after the 2003 Nigerian presidential election by Asari Dokubo and British Columbos Epibade. The idea was conceived by Dokubo after he exited as the president of the Ijaw Youth Council.
The inspiration for a militia was gotten from Isaac Boro, who in 1965, declared the Niger Delta Republic.

NDPVF in the Niger Delta conflicts

See also
Petroleum in Nigeria
Nigerian Oil Crisis
Ijaw
Other Separatist Groups - MASSOB
Movement for the Emancipation of the Niger Delta

References

Niger River Delta
Rebel groups in Nigeria